The Croatia men's national under-18 ice hockey team is the men's national under-18 ice hockey team of Croatia. The team is controlled by the Croatian Ice Hockey Federation, a member of the International Ice Hockey Federation. The team represents Croatia at the IIHF World U18 Championships.

International competitions

IIHF World U18 Championships

External links
Croatia at IIHF.com

Under
National under-18 ice hockey teams